The 2012–13 Regionalliga was the fifth season of the Regionalliga as the fourth tier of the German football league system. From this season onwards, the structure of this tier has changed. The three division format administrated by the German FA has been replaced by five leagues, each of which is administrated by its respective regional FA. Additionally, the leagues will be structured on geographical affiliation, in contrast to the partially arbitrary divisional alignment. League champions will qualify for a promotion play-off. Additionally, the Regionalliga Südwest runners-up will qualify.

Regionalliga Nord 

18 teams from Bremen, Hamburg, Lower Saxony and Schleswig-Holstein competed in the first season of the reformed Regionalliga Nord. Holstein Kiel won the championship and also won their promotion playoff, winning promotion to 3. Liga. Both VfB Lübeck and FC Oberneuland entered insolvency proceedings during the season; results involving these two teams were annulled. Kiel's promotion and the fact that no team was relegated from the 3. Liga meant that the number of relegated teams was reduced to just two.

League table

Top goalscorer

Regionalliga Nordost

16 teams from Berlin, Brandenburg, Mecklenburg-Vorpommern, Saxony, Saxony-Anhalt and Thuringia competed in the first season of the reformed Regionalliga Nordost. RB Leipzig won the league, suffering no defeats, and also won their promotion playoff, gaining promotion to 3. Liga. As SV Babelsberg 03 was relegated from 3. Liga and Leipzig won promotion, the standard two teams were relegated. In FC Carl Zeiss Jena, 1. FC Lok Leipzig and 1. FC Magdeburg, this fourth-tier league contains three teams that have been finalists in European competitions, Magdeburg even winning the 1974 European Cup Winners' Cup.

League table

Top goalscorer

Regionalliga West 

20 teams from North Rhine-Westphalia competed in the first season of the reformed Regionalliga West.

League table

Top goalscorer

Regionalliga Südwest 

19 teams from Bavaria, Baden-Württemberg, Hesse, Rhineland-Palatinate and Saarland competed in the first season of the newly formed Regionalliga Südwest.

League table

Top goalscorer

Regionalliga Bayern 

20 teams from Bavaria competed in the first season of the newly formed Regionalliga Bayern.

League table

Top goalscorer

Promotion play-offs
The draw for the 2012–13 promotion play-offs was held on 12 May 2013.

Summary
The first legs were played on 29 May, and the second legs were played on 2 and 4 June 2013.

|}

Matches
All times Central European Summer Time (UTC+2)

RB Leipzig won 4–2 on aggregate.

Holstein Kiel won 4–1 on aggregate.

SV Elversberg won 4–3 on aggregate.

Notes

References 

Regionalliga seasons
4
German